Frederick James Haycock (19 April 1912 – 10 April 1989) was an English footballer, who played as a forward.

Career
Haycock started his career at Waterford, where he earned a cap in the League of Ireland XI.

He then moved around, before ending up at Aston Villa where he made 99 league appearances.

During World War II, Haycock guested for many clubs, including Liverpool, Leicester and Wolverhampton Wanderers.

After the War, Haycock would then move to Wrexham, appearing six times for the Welsh club.

References

1912 births
1989 deaths
English footballers
English Football League players
Waterford F.C. players
Blackburn Rovers F.C. players
Prescot Cables F.C. players
Aston Villa F.C. players
Wrexham A.F.C. players
Hednesford Town F.C. players
Association football forwards
Sportspeople from Bootle